The decade of the 1990s in film involved many significant developments in cinema. Continuing from the 1980s, low-budget independent films unceasingly rose and maintained their popularity in the industry within the decade.

Events 

 Thousands of full-length films were produced during the 1990s. Many were specifically filmed or edited to be displayed both on theater screens as well as on the smaller TV screens, such as showing close-up scenes during dialog, rather than just wide-angle scenes in a room. The home-video market became a major factor in the total revenue for a film, often doubling its total income.
 The decade was notable for both the rise of independent cinema – as well as independent studios such as Miramax, Lions Gate, and New Line – and the advancements in CGI-technology, seen in such films as Terminator 2: Judgment Day, Jurassic Park, and Forrest Gump. Toy Story (1995) became the first feature length film to be completely computer animated, heralding its use as a tool for filmmakers to achieve new visuals for film.
 The Disney Renaissance began in late 1989 with The Little Mermaid, reached its peak in popularity with The Lion King in 1994, and ended in 1999 with Tarzan.
 1988's Die Hard established what would become a common formula for many 90s action films, featuring a lone everyman against a colorful terrorist character who's usually holding hostages in an isolated setting. Such films and their sequels are often referred to as "Die Hard on a _": Under Siege (battleship), Cliffhanger (mountain), Speed (bus), “Under Siege 2: Dark Territory”(on a train), The Rock (prison island), Con Air (prison plane), Air Force One (presidential plane), etc...
 A resurgence of disaster films dominated the box office with blockbusters such as Twister, Independence Day, Titanic, and Armageddon.
 Several leading figures of 1980s to mid-1990s Hong Kong action cinema migrated to Hollywood with varying success: Jackie Chan, Jet Li, Chow Yun-fat, Michelle Yeoh, John Woo, Yuen Woo-ping, Tsui Hark, etc... Updating martial arts and gunfight choreography in American motion pictures with such releases as Broken Arrow, Face/Off, Tomorrow Never Dies, Lethal Weapon 4, Rush Hour, and The Matrix.
 The release of Scream revitalized the declining popularity of slasher films by satirizing the subgenre with characters that are well-versed in its clichés. Leading to studios capitalizing especially on the teenage and young adult demographic with the likes of I Know What You Did Last Summer, Scream 2, Urban Legend, and I Still Know What You Did Last Summer. Three of the mentioned films were written or adapted by Kevin Williamson, who also co-wrote the sci-fi horror The Faculty'', which targeted the same audience as well.

Highest-grossing films

List of films 

 1990 in film
 1991 in film
 1992 in film
 1993 in film
 1994 in film
 1995 in film
 1996 in film
 1997 in film
 1998 in film
 1999 in film

See also 
 Film, History of film, lists of films
 Popular culture: 1990s in music, 1990s in television
 Worst films of the 1990s

References 

 
Films by decade
Film by decade
1990s decade overviews